Religious Affairs Bureau can refer to the following:

 State Administration for Religious Affairs, a former state institution of the People's Republic of China
 Bureau of Religion, a former state institution of the Empire of Japan